The 1994 New York Attorney General election took place on November 8, 1994. Republican nominee Dennis Vacco narrowly defeated Democratic nominee Karen Burstein. , this is the last time a Republican was elected Attorney General of New York.

General Election Results

References

See also

1994
Attorney General
New York